The 2021 Conference Carolinas men's volleyball tournament is the men's volleyball tournament for Conference Carolinas during the 2021 NCAA Division I & II men's volleyball season. It will be held April 8 through April 18, 2021. First Round and Quarterfinal matches will be held at campus sites while the semifinals and championship will be held at Student Center Complex in Bristol, Tennessee. The winner receives the conference's automatic bid to the 2021 NCAA Volleyball Tournament.

Seeds
All 8 teams are eligible for the postseason. A bye system is used awarding higher seeds byes to the quarter and semifinals. Teams are seeded by record within the conference, with a tiebreaker system to seed teams with identical conference records.

Schedule and results

Bracket

All–Tournament Team
Most Outstanding Player - Brennan Davis, Belmont Abbey
Joshua Kim, King
Diego Rosich, North Greenville
Eric Visgitis, Mount Olive
Trevor Tresser, Mount Olive
Matteo Miselli, Belmont Abbey
Daniel Cerqua, Belmont Abbey

References

2021 Conference Carolinas men's volleyball season
Volleyball competitions in the United States